The Bureau of Entomology was a unit within the Federal government of the United States from 1894 to 1934.  It developed from a section of the Department of Agriculture which had been working on entomological researches and allied issues relating to insects. In 1934 it was merged with the Bureau of Plant Quarantine to form the Bureau of Entomology and Plant Quarantine. A later merger with the Bureau of Animal Industry created the Agricultural Research Service in 1953.

Early developments
The American Entomological Society was organized at Philadelphia in 1859, incorporated in 1862, and known until 1867 as the Entomological Society of Philadelphia.  On Friday, May 18, 1866, Mr. O'Neill requested an appropriation from the Congress of the United States to maintain the organization's publication Practical Entomologist.  The request for Federal funds established a connection between the organization and the Federal government.

The Department of Agriculture was created on July 1, 1862.  It included four bureaus, one of which eventually became identified with the Bureau of Entomology.  An "entomological division" in the Department of Agriculture existed in 1872, according to Congressional records.

Insect pests reach the United States
The gipsy moth was introduced by accident from Europe into Massachusetts about 1861.  The sweet potato weevil was first discovered in 1875.  About 1892, the brown-tail moth was introduced near Boston from Europe.  The boll weevil entered Texas about 1892 in the vicinity of Brownsville.  The Argentine ant was first discovered in the United States at New Orleans in 1891, New International Encyclopedia  and the alfalfa leaf weevil was first discovered in Utah in 1904.  Establishing control over an increasing number of insect pests and insect-borne diseases led to the establishment of the Bureau of Entomology.

Duties of the Bureau of Entomology

Insect pests
The Bureau of Entomology conducted researches into methods which could reduce the spread and the frequency of occurrence of insect pests.  It developed various approaches towards accomplishing its goals.  The introduction of the natural enemies of insect pests has brought control of many insect pests.

Beneficial insects
Investigations of bee diseases, the greatest handicap with which the beekeeper has to had to deal, resulted in a number of discoveries of great importance.  A disease of the brood which had often been mistaken for one of the foul broods and to which the name "sacbrood" is given was found to be due to a filterable virus.  The deadly Isle of Wight disease of the adult bee, occurring in Great Britain and on the Continent, was discovered to be caused by the mite Acarapis woodi in the tracheæ, and an embargo was placed upon the importation of bees in order to prevent its introduction into the United States.

Later developments
Resorting to legislative means, Congress enacted the Federal Plant Quarantine Act of August 20, 1912, which immediately became effective as to certain quarantines, and was administered by the Federal Horticultural Board, consisting of five members appointed by the Secretary of Agriculture. A quarantine against insect pests and diseases from abroad was established and maintained, inspectors having been stationed at every port of entry by land and sea.  Quarantines were established within the United States against the spread of a number of important pests.  The investigational and control work was carried on by the Federal government through the Bureau of Entomology and the Horticultural and Insecticide and Fungicide Boards.  In the States the work was conducted by the experiment stations, State entomologists, and in several instances by crop pest commissions.  The Federal Bureau of Entomology administered the work through its several divisions.  In 1924 it had 83 field stations in 32 states and Territories and three foreign countries.

Many States have enacted laws which have created State Boards of Entomology.  The interstate spread of pests has been prevented to a large extent through State regulations requiring that nursery stock be free from infestation, and these are enforced by rigid State inspection.

Later insect pests

Pink bollworm
In November, 1916, the occurrence of the pink bollworm in the Laguna district of Coahuila, Mexico, within 200 miles (322 km) of the Texas border, was discovered, and an embargo was placed upon the importation of Mexican cotton.  Infestations were found in several counties in Texas and Louisiana.  The infested areas were at once quarantined and eradication work was pressed with vigor under appropriations by Congress.  The pink bollworm originated in India and has been spread to many cotton-producing nations by man.

European corn borer
Late in the year 1917 the widely distributed European and Asiatic pest Pyrausta nubilalis Hubn., a moth whose larva is a borer, was discovered to have become established in an area approximately of 100 square miles (259 km2) in several counties in eastern Massachusetts, where it caused serious injury to corn and particularly to sweet corn.  
The European corn borer attacks all of the corn plant above ground except the leaf blades.

Japanese beetle
The green beetle Popillia japonica was introduced from Japan with nursery stock and became established near Riverton, N. J., where it was discovered in the summer of 1916.  By the fall of 1922 an area of 773 square miles (2002 km2) had become infested.

Oriental peach moth
The Oriental peach moth was first discovered in the District of Columbia in 1916.  It is supposed to have been introduced with flowering cherry trees from Japan.

Pine shoot moth
The destructive pine shoot moth was discovered in 1914 to have been introduced from Europe and to have become established in 10 localities in three States from Massachusetts to Pennsylvania, and the following year from 20 localities in nine states, in none of which except on Long Island had it lasted for longer than two years.

Mediterranean fruit fly
The Mediterranean fruit fly was first discovered in Hawaii on the Island of Oahu in 1910.  Its introduction into the Island of Bermuda many years earlier had destroyed the fruit-growing capacity of that island.  Congress provided appropriations to prevent its spread to the mainland.

Some other insect pests
 European red mite
 European earwig
 European satin moth
 Australian tomato beetle
 Camphor thrips
 Pea moth
 Fruit-tree leaf roller
 Potato leaf hopper
 Codling moth

Entomologists
Leland Ossian Howard led the Bureau of Entomology. Grace Sandhouse, who studied apoidea, worked at the Bureau from 1926 until her death in 1940. Lewis Hart Weld worked at the Bureau until his resignation in 1924.

References

External links 

 Guide to the Bureau of Entomology Postcards circa 1925
 This article incorporates text from a publication now in the public domain: Gilman, D. C.; Peck, H. T.; Colby, F. M., eds. (1905). New International Encyclopedia (1st ed.). New York: Dodd, Mead.

Entomology, Bureau of